The Advanced Photon Source (APS) at Argonne National Laboratory (in Lemont, Illinois) is a storage-ring-based high-energy X-ray light source facility. It is one of five X-ray light sources owned and funded by the U.S. Department of Energy Office of Science. The APS began operation on March 26, 1995. It is operated as a user facility, meaning that it is open to the world’s scientific community, and more than 5,500 researchers make use of its resources each year.

How APS works

The APS uses a series of particle accelerators to push electrons up to nearly the speed of light, and then injects them into a storage ring that is roughly two-thirds of a mile around. At every bend in the track, these electrons emit synchrotron radiation in the form of ultrabright X-rays. Scientists at 65 experiment stations around the ring use these X-rays for basic and applied research in a number of fields.

Scientists use the X-rays generated by the APS to peer inside batteries, with the goal of creating longer-lasting, faster-charging energy storage devices; to improve 3D printing for more durable materials; to learn more about the behavior of charged particles in order to improve electronics; and to map the brain to understand more about neurological diseases. APS research played a role in the development of the COVID-19 vaccines in use in the United States.

The Experiment Hall surrounds the storage ring and is divided into 35 sectors, each of which has access to x-ray beamlines, one at an insertion device, and the other at a bending magnet.  Each sector also corresponds to a lab/office module offering immediate access to the beamline.

Two Nobel prizes in chemistry have been granted for work performed in part at the APS. The 2009 prize was awarded for the discovery of the structure of the ribosome, and the 2012 prize for the structure of G-protein coupled receptors.

APS upgrade 
The APS is currently undergoing an upgrade that will see the original storage ring replaced with a new multi-bend achromat lattice, nine new feature beamlines built and 15 existing beamlines enhanced. The result will be X-rays that are up to 500 times brighter than those currently generated, and beamlines that will enable greater focusing ability to examine smaller materials in sharper detail. The installation period for the new storage ring is scheduled for completion in 2024.

See also
 Keith Moffat
  EPICS

References

External links

 
 
 
 
 
 
 
Lightsources.org

Argonne National Laboratory
Synchrotron radiation facilities